Xylotrechus schaefferi is a species of beetle in the family Cerambycidae. It was described by Schott in 1925.

References

Xylotrechus
Beetles described in 1925